Joseph Robert Johnson (13 September 1920 – 1 September 2005) was a Scottish professional football player who is best known for his time with Rangers.

Born in Greenock, Johnson began his career at Arthurlie before joining Rangers in 1947. He stayed with the club for five years making sporadic appearances and going on loan to Falkirk in 1950. He then moved to England and had season long spells with Lincoln City and Workington. Upon returning to Scotland, Johnson joined Elgin City, who at that time were not in the Scottish Football League. He died on 31 May 1988 in Vancouver, BC, Canada.

References

External links

1920 births
2005 deaths
Arthurlie F.C. players
Association football inside forwards
Elgin City F.C. players
English Football League players
Falkirk F.C. players
Lincoln City F.C. players
Rangers F.C. players
Scottish Football League players
Scottish footballers
Scottish Junior Football Association players
Footballers from Greenock
Workington A.F.C. players